Edward O'Neill, 2nd Baron O'Neill (31 December 1839 – 19 November 1928), known as Edward Chichester until 1855, was an Irish peer and Conservative politician.

O'Neill was the eldest son of William O'Neill, 1st Baron O'Neill, and his first wife Henrietta (née Torrens), daughter of Robert Torrens, judge of the Court of Common Pleas (Ireland). He was elected to the House of Commons for County Antrim in 1863, a seat he held until 1880. In 1883 he succeeded his father in the barony and entered the House of Lords.

Lord O'Neill married Lady Louisa Katherine Emma, daughter of Thomas Barnes Cochrane, 11th Earl of Dundonald, in 1873. Their third son Hugh became a prominent politician and was created Baron Rathcavan in 1953. Lord O'Neill died in November 1928, aged 88, and was succeeded in the barony by his grandson Shane, the son of his second but eldest surviving son Captain the Hon. Arthur O'Neill, who had been killed in the First World War. Arthur's younger son and another of Lord O'Neill's grandsons was Terence O'Neill, Prime Minister of Northern Ireland. Lady O'Neill died in 1942.

References
 Kidd, Charles, Williamson, David (editors) Debrett's Peerage and Baronetage (New York: St Martin's Press, 1990).
 Williamson, D (ed.) Debrett's Peerage and Baronetage (106th edition) (London 2002)

www.thepeerage.com

External links 
 
 

1839 births
1928 deaths
Barons in the Peerage of the United Kingdom
Edward
Members of the Parliament of the United Kingdom for County Antrim constituencies (1801–1922)
UK MPs 1859–1865
UK MPs 1865–1868
UK MPs 1868–1874
UK MPs 1874–1880
UK MPs who inherited peerages
Irish Conservative Party MPs
Eldest sons of British hereditary barons